The acoustic pressure in a cylindrical duct can be expressed as the superposition of duct modes:

The duct mode shape are analytically determined from the solution of the Helmholtz equation.

References

Acoustics